Zsófia Rácz (born 28 December 1988 in Győr) is a Hungarian football midfielder currently playing for PSV Eindhoven in the Eredivisie. She first played the Champions League in 2010.

She is a member of the Hungarian national team since 2007.

References

External links
 

1988 births
Living people
Hungarian women's footballers
Viktória FC-Szombathely players
1. FC Lübars players
MSV Duisburg (women) players
PSV (women) players
Hungarian expatriate sportspeople in Germany
Hungarian expatriate footballers
Expatriate women's footballers in Germany
Expatriate women's footballers in the Netherlands
Frauen-Bundesliga players
Eredivisie (women) players
Women's association football midfielders
Hungary women's international footballers
FIFA Century Club
Sportspeople from Győr